Kang Ok-sun (born April 14, 1946) is a female North Korean former volleyball player who competed in the 1972 Summer Olympics.

In 1972 she was part of the North Korean team which won the bronze medal in the Olympic tournament. She played all five matches.

External links
 Profile - Sports Reference

1946 births
Living people
Olympic volleyball players of North Korea
Volleyball players at the 1972 Summer Olympics
Olympic bronze medalists for North Korea
North Korean women's volleyball players
Olympic medalists in volleyball
Medalists at the 1972 Summer Olympics
20th-century North Korean women